Stephen's Green Shopping Centre is a large indoor shopping centre at the top of Grafton Street in Dublin, Ireland. It is named after St. Stephen's Green, a city park situated across the road from its main entrance. Its street address is St. Stephen's Green West.

History

Site and Dandelion Market (1966–1986)
The site of the shopping centre was assembled over 15 years by the Slazenger family, beginning in 1966. In total, more than 150 individual property owners were bought out over that period. Most of the buildings were Georgian, and these were left to fall into disrepair and ruin as plans for an extensive redevelopment of the site as an office block and shopping centre totalling almost half-a-million square feet were drawn up. The original architects were Scott Tallon Walker, and planning permission for their scheme was granted in 1975. During the recession of the late 1970s, the small shops were rented out under a scheme known as "the Gaiety Green". At the weekends, this was marketed as the Dandelion Market, known for its alternative vendors, popular with younger people. U2 played some of their earliest gigs at the market. The market, which closed in 1981, is commemorated with a plaque, while Sinnotts Bar on South King Street is the only trader from the original site that remains.

The site was put up for sale in 1980, and was purchased by Patrick Gallagher in April 1981 for £10.5 million. Most of the buildings on the site were demolished while Gallagher attempted to sell the site to Irish Life, without success. He also sought permission to erect a show house for his Fortunestown development in Tallaght but this was rejected by Dublin Corporation. After Gallagher went bankrupt, the site was re-acquired by the Slazengers, and it was placed back on the market in 1983, and later sold for £5 million to Power Securities. They drew up plans for 7 acres of retail, bar and restaurant spaces, with 40 luxury flats and parking for 800 cars.

Development and Construction
The centre in its final form was developed by British Land under a design by James Toomey.

Work began on the shopping centre in 1986, with plans for anchor and specialist shops, restaurants and bars, leisure facilities, and, at a cost of £15 million, 700 parking spaces.

Opening and operation
The project was completed in 1988, with a total budget of £50 million, and the centre officially opened its doors on 8 November that year, though with only 4 units ready on the first day. The use of glass and ornate white iron work on the exterior has been "likened to a Mississippi steamboat moored on the edge of the Green" and the building is locally often called "The Wedding Cake".

In 2019, a fund managed by Davy Group acquired the remaining portions of the property not under its ownership.

Shops 
The centre has over 100 outlets. Major retailers include Dunnes Stores, Boots, GameStop and TK Maxx.

References

Notes

Sources

External links 

 

Shopping centres in County Dublin
Buildings and structures in Dublin (city)
St Stephen's Green